The following list includes notable people who were born or have lived in the region of Malwa, India.

Historical
 Rajmata Ahilya Devi Holkar, ruler of Indore state of the Holkars
 Bhartrihari (570-651?)
 Brahmagupta (598 - 668), mathematician
 Bhoj (1010–1060), king
 Bhāskara II (1114–1185), mathematician
 Chandragupta Vikramaditya  (375 - 415), legendary king
 Dhanvantari
 Kalidasa (c 100? BC - c 400? AD), Sanskrit playwright
 Mahinda, Buddhist monk depicted in Buddhist sources as bringing Buddhism to Sri Lanka; first-born son of the Mauryan emperor Ashoka from his wife Devi
 Malhar Rao Holkar Holkar dynasty founders....and first Maratha Empire subedar Madhya Bharat
 Sanghamitra, daughter of Emperor Ashoka and his wife, Vidisha Dev
 Siddhasena
 Varahamihira (505 - 587), astronomer and mathematician

Artists and literary figures
 Hafeez Contractor, architect of India; born in Mumbai
 Asghar Ali Engineer, graduated with a degree in civil engineering from Vikram University
 Sagarika Ghatge, Indian film actress; daughter of the actor Vijayendra Ghatge
 Vijayendra Ghatge, actor in the Hindi film industry; son of Sita Raje Ghatge, who was the daughter of Maharaja Tukojirao Holkar III of Indore (reigned 1903–1926)
 Umakant Gundecha and Ramakant Gundecha, leading Dagarvani dhrupad singers
 M.F. Husain, eminent painter; spent his childhood in Indore
 Rahat Indori, Urdu poet and songwriter in Hindi films
 Celina Jaitley, Shimla-born Indian actress; mainly appears in Bollywood films; her parents live in the army town of Mhow in the Indore district
 Ustad Amir Khan (born 1912),  Hindustani classical vocalist; referred to his unique style of khyal singing as "Indore Gharana"; born in Indore
 Digvijay Bhonsale, (born 31-03-1989) Rock/Metal Musician, Lead Vocalist/Guitarist of Nicotine, Metal band from Indore; studied at Daly College, Indore and Cardiff Metropolitan University, UK
 Rais Khan (born 1938), Indian sitar maestro; born in Indore
 Salman Khan, Indian film actor who appears in Bollywood movies; born in Indore
 Sneha Khanwalkar, Indian music director who works in Bollywood; brought up in Indore
 Swanand Kirkire, lyricist, singer, and writer; born in Indore
 Kiran Kumar, Mumbai-based Kashmiri Indian actor; studied at Daly College, Indore
 Kishore Kumar, playback singer and actor; belonged to Khandwa; studied at the Indore Christian College and used to stay in the hostel
 Ankita Lokhande, Indian television actress; brought up in Indore
 Lata Mangeshkar, playback singer, born in Indore to Pandit Dinanath Mangeshkar
 Sachida Nagdev, contemporary Indian artist 
 Pradeep (1915–1998), Indian poet and songwriter who is best known for his patriotic song "Aye Mere Watan Ke Logo"
 Kunwar Amarjeet Singh, hip-hop and contemporary style dancer; played lead role in Dil Dosti Dance
 Prahlad Tipanya, Kabir folksinger from Lunyakheri village; recipient of the Sangeet Natak Akademi award
 Mahadevi Varma, Hindi poet; freedom fighter; was married to Dr Swarup Narain Varma in Indore
 Johnny Walker, famous comic actor;  born in Indore
 Kunwar Amarjeet Singh, hip-hop and contemporary style dancer; played lead role in Dil Dosti Dance
 Zakir Khan, Stand-up comedian,
 Shahbaz Khan (actor), Television actor, known for his role in "Chandrakanta" as "Kunwar Virendra Singh"; Son of Ustad Amir Khan, born and raised in indore.
Mantra Well known RJ, Actor, Comedian; born and raised in Indore.

Rulers, nationalists, and politicians
 Devi Ahilya Bai Holkar, most noted ruler of Holker State; built numerous temples, wells and dharamshalas all over India; spent most of her life in Maheshwar, then capital of the Holkars, situated on the banks of the Narmada and is said to have visited Indore only twice in her lifetime; her name is synonymous with Indore, and the university and airport are named after her
 Maharaja Yashwantrao Holkar, key figure in Maratha history; galvanized several years of resistance against the British Empire; was called the Napoleon of India
 Yeshwantrao Holkar II (born 1908), the Maharaja of Indore belonging to the Holkar dynasty of the Marathas; born in Indore
 Field Marshal K. M. Cariappa, first Indian Commander-in-Chief of the Indian Army; studied at Daly College Indore
 Field Marshal Sam Bahadur Manekshaw, Commandant of the Infantry School, Mhow during the 1950s
 Yashoda Devi, first woman to be elected from a former princely state of India as a member of a legislative assembly
 Jyotiraditya Scindia, Indian Politician, former President of MPCA, Hereditary Patron of Daly College, Indore 
 Sumitra Mahajan, Bharatiya Janata Party Leader and MP; Member of Parliament from Indore Lok Sabha constituency since 1989
 Digvijay Singh, Indian politician; former Chief Minister of Madhya Pradesh; senior leader of the Indian National Congress political party; studied at Daly College in Indore; alumnus of Shri Govindram Seksaria Institute of Technology and Science, Indore
 Pushpa Devi Singh, Indian politician
 Sartaj Singh, PWD minister in government of Madhya Pradesh 
 Kaptan Singh Solanki, Indian politician of the Bharatiya Janata Party
 General K. Sundarji, Commandant of the College of Combat, Mhow (now known as Army War College) during the early 1980s
 Kailash Vijayvargiya,  leader of Bharatiya Janata Party; ex-Mayor of Indore
 Thawar Chand Gehlot, cabinet minister in the Ministry of Social Justice and Empowerment in Narendra Modi government 
 Paras Chandra Jain, leader of Bharatiya Janata Party
 Satyanarayan Jatiya, former cabinet minister from 1999 to 2004 and held portfolios of labour and social justice and empowerment
 Ajit Jogi, first chief minister of the state of Chhattisgarh; District Magistrate of Indore in the 1980s
 Prabhash Joshi, journalist; editor in chief of Jansatta (The Indian Express group)
 Hukam Chand Kachwai, leader of Bharatiya Janata Party 
 Guru Radha Kishan, Swatantrata Sangram Sainik, fought valiantly for the economic deprivation for the poor and the issues of social deprivation
 Prakash Chandra Sethi, Indian National Congress politician; Chief Minister of Madhya Pradesh, was the Member of Parliament from Indore Lok Sabha constituency (1984–1989); served in a number of positions in the Centre, including Home Minister, Defence Minister, Minister of External Affairs, Finance Minister, Railways, and Housing and Development
 Dr. B.R. Ambedkar, father of the Indian Constitution; campaigner for Dalit rights; born in Mhow

Sports persons
 Sandhya Agarwal, former captain of Indian women's cricket team
 Captain Mushtaq Ali, Colonel Nayudu's teammate in the Holkar team and in the Indian team; popularly known as the 'Errol Flynn' of Indian cricket
 Captain Syed Mushtaq Ali (1914–2005), Indian international cricketer; born and died in Indore
 Minoti Desai (born 1968), Indian cricketer; represented Indian women's team; born in Indore
 Rahul Dravid, Indian cricketer; former captain of the Indian cricket; born in Indore
 Raj Singh Dungarpur, former president of the Board of Control for Cricket in India; former Indian cricket selector was an ex-student of Daly College, Indore
 Narendra Hirwani, leg spin bowler; former member of Indian cricket team; moved to Indore when he was a teenager
 Sanjay Jagdale, former state cricketer; presently one of the national selectors for the senior all-India teams and the honorary secretary of the Madhya Pradesh Cricket Association; director of the Cricket Club of Indore
 Amay Khurasiya, former member of Indian Cricket team; studied in Indore
 Shankar Lakshman (1933–2006), goalkeeper of the Indian hockey team in the 1956, 1960 and 1964 Olympics and won two golds and a silver; captain of the team which won the gold in the 1966 Asian Games; belonged to Mhow and lived his retired life here until his death
 Colonel C.K. Nayudu, first Indian Test Captain in cricket; led India between 1932 and 1934
 Mir Ranjan Negi, hockey goalkeeper and coach of Indian women's team; won Asian Championship
 Naman Ojha, Indian cricketer
 Chandu Sarwate (died in 2003), former Indian cricketer and former Indian cricket selector; lived and died in Indore
 Jalaj Saxena (born 1986), cricketer; plays as an all rounder for the India A cricket team; born in Indore

Academia, business and professionals
 Seth Hukumchand,  He was known as the 'Cotton Prince of India' and had much credit even in some overseas countries.
 Dr S Prakash Tiwari, Former Vice-Chancellor of S. K. Rajasthan Agricultural University, Bikaner, and Former Director of National Academy of Agricultural Research Management (NAARM), Hyderabad.
 Siddhartha Paul Tiwari, Academician and Researcher, 'India Science Award' Awardee
 Deepak Chaurasia, journalist, editor in chief of India News

See also 
 List of people of Indore, the largest city of Malwa

References

 http://www.webindia123.com/government/award/asp/award.asp?a_no=12&award=Arjuna+Award

People
Malwa
Malwa people